Aleksandar Tomov may refer to:
 Aleksandar Tomov (wrestler)
 Aleksandar Tomov (politician)